Ann Gertrude Browne-John (born 28 June 1955) is a Trinidadian former cricketer who played as a right-handed batter. She appeared in 11 One Day Internationals for the West Indies between 1993 and 1997, including captaining the side in nine matches. She played domestic cricket for Trinidad and Tobago.

Her sisters Beverly and Louise also played international cricket. She was appointed  as Lead Selector for the West Indies women's team in 2019.

References

External links
 
 

1955 births
Living people
West Indian women cricketers
West Indies women Test cricketers
West Indies women One Day International cricketers
West Indian women cricket captains
Trinidad and Tobago women cricketers
Trinidad and Tobago women cricket captains
Trinidad and Tobago cricket coaches
Wicket-keepers